The Card is a 1952 British comedy film version of the 1911 novel by Arnold Bennett. In America, the film was titled The Promoter. It was adapted by Eric Ambler and directed by Ronald Neame. It stars Alec Guinness, Glynis Johns, Valerie Hobson, and Petula Clark. The film was nominated for the Academy Award for Best Sound.

It is mainly faithful to the novel, omitting some minor incidents.

Plot
The film follows the adventures and misadventures of Edward Henry (Denry) Machin, an ambitious young man from a poor background.

Denry surreptitiously changes his poor grades to qualify for entry to a "school for the sons of gentlemen". At the age of 16, he becomes a junior clerk to Mr. Duncalf, the town clerk and a solicitor. He meets the charming and socially well-connected Countess of Chell, a client of Duncalf's, and is given the job of sending out invitations to a grand municipal ball. He "invites" himself, and wins a £5 bet that he will ask the countess to dance. This earns him the reputation of a "card" (a "character", someone able to set tongues wagging)—a reputation he is determined to cement, but the next day, Duncalf angrily sacks Denry.

Denry offers his services as a rent collector to a dissatisfied client of Duncalf's, Mrs Codleyn. His reputation as an efficient and no-nonsense collector brings the business of Mr Calvert.  Denry quickly realises, though, that he can make more money by advancing loans, at a highly profitable interest rate, to the many tenants who are in arrears. He also discovers that Ruth Earp, the dancing teacher who is attracted to Denry, is herself heavily in arrears to Mr. Calvert. Despite this,  Ruth and he  become engaged.

While on holiday in Llandudno with Ruth (accompanied by her friend Nellie Cotterill as chaperone), he witnesses a shipwreck and the rescue of the sailors—an event that he turns to his financial advantage. He also realises Ruth's spendthrift nature, and they part on bitter terms.

Denry starts up the Five Towns Universal Thrift Club, a bold venture that allows members to purchase goods on credit. This increases Denry's wealth and reputation, and he is able to expand further, due to the patronage of the countess.

Denry's social ambitions expand. He becomes a town councillor, and he purchases the rights to locally born Callear, the "greatest centre forward in England", for the failing local football club.
  
Ruth reappears, now the widow of a rich, older, titled man. He considers renewing their relationship, but is unsure of his (and her) feelings.

Nellie's father, a builder, is bankrupt (again), and the family decides to migrate to Canada. As they are boarding the ocean liner at Liverpool, Denry realises that Nellie is devastated at her potential loss, and that he really loves only her. Ruth, who is also present, is furious, but quickly starts a fresh relationship with another older, titled gentleman.

Nellie and Denry marry. Denry becomes the youngest mayor in the history of Bursley.

Cast

 Alec Guinness as Denry Machin
 Glynis Johns as Ruth Earp
 Valerie Hobson as Countess of Chell
 Petula Clark as Nellie Cotterill
 Edward Chapman as Herbert Duncalf
 Veronica Turleigh as Mrs Machin
 George Devine as Herbert Calvert
 Joan Hickson as Mrs Codleyn
 Frank Pettingell as 	Police Superintendent
 Gibb McLaughlin as	Emery
 Henry Edwards as	Mr. Cotterill
 Alison Leggatt as 	Mrs. Cotterill 
 Harold Goodwin as John
 Cameron Hall as 	Mr. Crain 
 Ann Lancaster as 	Miriam
 Peter Copley as  Shillitoe 
 Lyn Evans as	Cregeen
 Mark Daly as Mayor (uncredited)
 	Deidre Doyle as Widow Hullins 
 Frank Tickle as 	Mr. Bostock 
 Norman MacOwan	as	Simeon 
 Tom Gill as Miriam's Young Man
 Michael Trubshawe as Yeomanry Officer
 Michael Hordern as 	Bank Manager
 Wilfrid Hyde-White as Lord at Liverpool dock
 Brian Roper as Newsboy at Football Stadium 
 Raymond Rollett as Works Bandmaster
 Ewen Solon as 	Bookstall Attendant

Production
The film was made at Pinewood Studios near London. Location shooting took place largely in Burslem in Stoke-on-Trent, the basis for the fictional location of Bursley, and in the North Wales resort Llandudno. The football match was filmed at York Road, home of Maidenhead United FC. For Guinness, playing the romantic lead was a departure from his previously comic roles. The film was one of the first adult screen roles for Clark, who received her first screen kiss. Clark recorded a vocal version of the film's theme, with lyrics by her long-term accompanist, Joe "Mr Piano" Henderson.

Reception
A critic in The Manchester Guardian wrote that "Guinness appears to take only a perfunctory interest in 'Denry.' He plays him much too quietly", and that the film "never quite takes wings of fancy."

The New York Times critic Bosley Crowther gave the film a mixed review, writing "the script Eric Ambler has adapted from Arnold Bennett's old novel, The Card, is provokingly uninfested with dramatic compulsion or push. It just ambles along very gently from one situation to the next ... The Promoter, while vastly amusing in spots, is not a first-rate Guinness show."

In the New York Daily News, reviewer Kate Cameron called the film "delightfully amusing", awarding it three-and-a-half out of four stars.

References

External links

1952 films
1952 comedy films
British comedy films
British black-and-white films
Films based on works by Arnold Bennett
Films directed by Ronald Neame
Films scored by William Alwyn
Films set in Staffordshire
Films shot at Pinewood Studios
1950s English-language films
1950s British films